This list of people in Playboy 1953–1959 is a catalog of women and men who appeared in Playboy magazine in the years 1953 through 1959. Not all of the people featured in the magazine are pictured in the nude.

The entry in blue indicates that the issue marks the original appearance of that year's Playmate of the Year (PMOY).

1953

1954

1955

1956

1957

1958

1959

See also
List of people in Playboy 1960–1969
List of people in Playboy 1970–1979
List of people in Playboy 1980–1989
List of people in Playboy 1990–1999
List of people in Playboy 2000–2009
List of people in Playboy 2010–2020

References

Playboy lists
Playboy 1953-1959
Playboy 1953-1959
Playboy